The Former Wayside Chapel is a historic chapel at 24 River Road in Grand View-on-Hudson, Rockland County, New York. It is built of brownstone laid in uncoursed rows and features a steeply pitched slate-covered roof.

It was listed on the National Register of Historic Places in 2000.

References

Properties of religious function on the National Register of Historic Places in New York (state)
Churches completed in 1869
19th-century churches in the United States
Churches in Rockland County, New York
1869 establishments in New York (state)
National Register of Historic Places in Rockland County, New York